Mike Seal may refer to:

 Michael Seal (born 1970), British orchestral conductor and classical violinist
 Mike Seal (fighter) (born 1977), Mexican mixed martial artist